Lucien Moraweck (May 24, 1901, Belfort – October 20, 1973, San Diego, California) was a French jazz pianist.

Moraweck studied music formally at the Paris Conservatoire in his youth, but began devoting his attention primarily to jazz starting around 1924. He played alongside Edmond Cohanier in Georges Marion's Swiss band in 1925 and with Paul Gason's ensemble in Belgium. Through the end of the 1920s he played with a number of dance orchestras and with the ensembles of Lud Gluskin and Gregor. He later became conductor of the Jazz du Poste Parisien, and played with Michel Warlop and Wal-Berg in the mid-1930s. In 1934, he emigrated to the United States, where he worked again with Gluskin; the pair were nominated for an Academy Award for Best Original Score for their soundtrack to The Man in the Iron Mask. Lucien continued to compose and arrange music for cinema and television until his retirement in the mid 1960s.

External links
 Lucien Moraweck on IMDb

References
Michel Laplace, "Lucien Moraweck". The New Grove Dictionary of Jazz. 2nd edition, ed. Barry Kernfeld.

1901 births
1973 deaths
French emigrants to the United States
French jazz pianists
French male pianists
Musicians from Belfort
American jazz pianists
American male pianists
20th-century American male musicians
American male jazz musicians
20th-century American pianists